The Jana Sakthi is the organ of the Communist Party of India Tamil Nadu State Council. The first editor was P. Jeevanandham and it started in 1938. K. Subbarayan is the current editor of Jana Sakthi.

References

Communist periodicals published in India
Communist Party of India
Communist newspapers

Tamil language
Culture of Chennai